Herbert Nicholas Sheetz (March 4, 1882 – April 14, 1958) was an American football coach.  He served as the head football coach at Allegheny College in Meadville, Pennsylvania. He held that position for the 1907 and 1908 seasons. His coaching record at Allegheny 7–7–3.

Born in 1882 in Bucks County, Pennsylvania, Sheetz attended the Mercersburg Academy (1902), and Jefferson Medical College (1906), receiving his M.D. He was a physician at a hospital in McKeesport, Pennsylvania from 1906 to 1907. He died in 1958 in Allentown, Pennsylvania.

References

1882 births
1958 deaths
Allegheny Gators football coaches
Jefferson Medical College alumni
People from Bucks County, Pennsylvania
Physicians from Pennsylvania